Itto titrit (French title: L'etoile du matin) is a 2008 Moroccan film directed by Mohamed Abbazi. It was screened at the 10th edition of the National Film Festival held in Tangier, as well as in Algeria and in Doha.

Cast 
 Nisrine Fouad
 Amine Jebbor
 Sidi Moh Chakri
 Mustapha Qaderi
 Hadda Ouabbou
 Saadia Ibouda

References

External links 
 

2008 films
Moroccan drama films